John Charles Arthur Hyde (11 April 1930 – 26 March 2020) was an Australian rules footballer in the Victorian Football League (VFL) for the Geelong Football Club.

Originally from Portarlington, Victoria, Hyde won Geelong's best and fairest award in 1950 before playing in their back-to-back premierships in 1951 and 1952. Hyde left Victoria after the 1954 VFL season to join Claremont in the West Australian National Football League (WANFL) as captain-coach.

Hyde died of cancer on 26 March 2020. 

His son, John Norman Hyde, was a member of the Western Australian Legislative Assembly from 2001 to 2013.

External links

References 

Geelong Football Club players
Geelong Football Club Premiership players
Carji Greeves Medal winners
Australian rules footballers from Victoria (Australia)
Claremont Football Club players
Claremont Football Club coaches
1930 births
2020 deaths
Two-time VFL/AFL Premiership players